The following is a list of Ministers of Foreign Affairs of Ecuador since 1830, when Ecuador achieved independence after the dissolution of Gran Colombia.

Ministers 
1830: Esteban Febres Cordero
1830–1833: José Félix Valdivieso
1833–1834: Víctor Félix de San Miguel
1834–1835: Manuel Ignacio Pareja
1835–1838: José Miguel González y Alminati
1839–1843: Francisco Marcos
1843–1845: Benigno Malo
1845: José María Cucalón
1845: Pedro Carbo
1845: José María Urbina
1846–1847: José Fernández Salvador
1847–1849: Manuel Gómez de la Torre
1849: Pablo Vásconez
1849–1850: Benigno Malo
1850: Rafael Carvajal
1850–1851: Luis de Saá
1851: José Modesto Larrea
1851–1852: José de Villamil
1852: Javier Espinoza
1852: Pedro Fermín Cevallos
1852–1855: Marcos Espinel
1855: Pacífico Chiriboga
1855–1856: Ramón Borja
1856–1858: Antonio Mata
1858: Marcos Espinel
1859: Camilo Ponce
1859–1861: Roberto Ascásubi
1861–1864: Rafael Carvajal
1864–1865: Pablo Herrera
1865–1867: Manuel Bustamante
1867–1868: Rafael Carvajal
1868–1869: Camilo Ponce
1869: Rafael Carvajal
1869: Pablo Herrera
1869–1870: Francisco Javier Salazar
1870–1875: Francisco Javier León
1875: Manuel de Ascásubi
1875: Rafael Pólit
1875–1876: Manuel Gómez de la Torre
1876: Agustín Guerrero
1877–1878: Pedro Carbo
1878–1879: Julio Castro
1879–1881: Cornelio Vernaza
1881–1883: Francisco Arias
1883–1888: José Modesto Espinosa
1888: Elías Lasso
1888–1889: Francisco Javier Salazar
1889: Carlos R. Tobar
1890–1891: Francisco Javier Salazar
1891: Pedro José Cevallos
1891–1892: Agustín Guerrero
1892–1893: Honorato Vázquez
1893: Vicente Lucio Salazar
1893: Pedro Ignacio Lizarzaburu
1894–1895: Pablo Herrera
1895: Luis Salvador
1895: Aparicio Ribadeneira
1895: Luis F. Carbo
1895–1896: Ignacio Robles
1896: Francisco J. Montalvo
1896: Leonidas Pallares Arteta
1896: José de Lapierre
1896–1897: Rafael Gómez de la Torre
1897: Belisario Albán Mestanza
1897–1898: Rafael Gómez de la Torre
1898–1901: José Peralta
1901: Julio Arias
1901–1903: Alfredo Baquerizo Moreno
1903–1905: Miguel Valverde
1906: Manuel Montalvo
1906–1907: Pacífico Villagómez
1907–1908: Luis F. Carbo
1908: Alfredo Monge
1908–1909: César Borja Lavayen
1909–1910: Francisco X. Aguirre Jado
1910–1911: José Peralta
1911: Juan Francisco Freile Z.
1911–1912: Carlos R. Tobar
1912: Antonio E. Arcos
1912–1913: Cesareo Carrera
1913–1914: Luis Napoleón Dillon
1914–1916: Rafael H. Elizalde
1916–1919: Carlos M. Tobar Borgoño
1919–1920: Augusto Aguirre Aparicio
1920–1924: N. Clemente Ponce
1924: José Rafael Bustamante
1924–1925: Alberto Larrea Chiriboga
1925: Camilo Octavio Andrade
1925: José Rafael Bustamante
1926–1929: Homero Viteri Lafronte
1929–1931: Gonzalo Zaldumbide
1931: Modesto Larrea Jijón
1931–1932: Carlos Manuel Larrea
1932: Caton Cárdenas
1932–1933: Antonio J. Quevedo
1933: Francisco Guarderas
1933: Manuel Cabeza de Vaca
1933–1934: José Gabriel Navarro
1934: Manuel Sotomayor y Luna
1934–1935: Alejandro Ponce Borja
1935–1936: Ángel Isaac Chiriboga
1936–1938: Carlos Manuel Larrea
1938: Luis Bossano
1938–1942: Julio Tobar Donoso
1942–1944: Francisco Guarderas
1944–1945: Camilo Ponce Enríquez
1945–1947: José Vicente Trujillo
1947–1948: Antonio Parra Velasco
1948–1952: Neftalí Ponce Miranda
1952–1953: Teodoro Alvarado Garaicoa
1953: Arturo Borrero Bustamante
1953–1955: Luis Antonio Peñaherrera
1955–1956: Rafael Arizaga Vega
1956: Jorge Villagómez Yépez
1956–1960: Carlos Tobar Zaldumbide
1960–1961: José Ricardo Chiriboga Villagómez
1961: Wilson Vela Hervas
1961–1962: Francisco Acosta Yépez
1962–1963: Benjamín Peralta Páez
1963–1964: Neftalí Ponce Miranda
1964–1965: Gonzalo Escudero Moscoso
1965: Wilson Córdova Moscoso
1965–1966: Luis Valencia Rodríguez
1966: Jorge Salvador Lara
1966–1967: Jorge Carrera Andrade
1967–1968: Julio Prado Vallejo
1968: Gustavo Larrea Córdova
1968–1970: Rogelio Valdivieso Eguiguren
1970–1971: José María Ponce Yépez
1971–1972: Rafael García Velasco
1972–1975: Antonio José Lucio Paredes
1975–1976: Carlos Aguirre Asanza
1976: Armando Pesantes García
1976–1977: Jorge Salvador Lara
1977–1979: José Ayala Lasso
1979–1980: Alfredo Pareja Diezcanseco
1980–1981: Alfonso Barrera Valverde
1981–1984: Luis Valencia Rodríguez
1984–1987: Édgar Terán Terán
1987–1988: Rafael García Velasco
1988–1992: Diego Cordovez Zegers
1992–1994: Diego Paredes Peña
1994–1997: Galo Leoro Franco
1997–1999: José Ayala Lasso
1999–2000: Benjamín Ortiz Brennan
2000–2003: Heinz Moeller Freile
2003: Nina Pacari
2003–2005: Patricio Zuquilanda
2005: Antonio Parra Gil
2005–2007: Francisco Carrión
2007: María Fernanda Espinosa
2007–2008: María Isabel Salvador
2008–2010: Fander Falconí
2010: Lautaro Pozo Malo (acting)
2010–2016: Ricardo Patiño
2016–2017: Guillaume Long
2017–2018: María Fernanda Espinosa
2018–2020: José Valencia Amores
2020-2021: Luis Gallegos
2021: Manuel Antonio Mejía Dalmau 
2021: Mauricio Montalvo Samaniego

Sources
Rulers.org – Foreign ministers E–K

Ecuador
Foreign Ministers
Ecuador politics-related lists
 
Foreign Ministers